Wilbert "Tee" Theodore Holloway (born August 3, 1948) is a former member of the Miami-Dade County School Board and a former member of the Florida House of Representatives. He was appointed to the Miami-Dade County School Board by then-Governor Charlie Crist in 2007.

He was born in Miami and graduated from Miami Northwestern Senior High School in 1966. He has a B.S. in Business Administration from Bethune-Cookman University. He married Linda Hodges and has four children. He served in the Florida House from 2001 until 2007. He is Baptist. Florida Memory has a photo of him with Will Kendrick on the House floor in 2007.

References

1948 births
Living people
Democratic Party members of the Florida House of Representatives
Bethune–Cookman University alumni
21st-century Baptists
Baptists from Florida
School board members in Florida
21st-century American politicians